Parahyponomeuta egregiella is a moth of the family Yponomeutidae. It is known from the Iberian Peninsula, Italy, Sardinia, Corsica, France, Switzerland and Luxembourg.

References

External links
lepiforum.de

Moths described in 1838
Yponomeutidae
Moths of Europe

pt:Parahyponomeuta
vi:Parahyponomeuta